Elsa  Cross (born March 6, 1946 in Mexico City), is a contemporary Spanish-language Mexican writer perhaps best known for her poetry.  She has also published translations, philosophical essays and is known as an authority on Indian philosophy.

She has a doctorate in Philosophy and Letters from Universidad Nacional Autónoma de México (UNAM) and is currently a professor in that Faculty.

In 1990, she was awarded the Premio Nacional de Poesía Aguascalientes for her book of poems El diván de Antar.  She is also the recipient of the Premio Nacional de Poesía Jaime Sabines (in 1992).

According to Octavio Paz, Elsa Cross is one of the most personal voices in recent Latin-American poetry.  Her work, already considerable, includes some of the most perfect poems of the last generation of Mexican writers.  I say voice and not poetic writing since poetry, although written, must always be spoken. Two opposing notes reconcile harmoniously in Elsa Cross: the complexity of her thought and the clarity of her diction.

Speaking of her poetry, Cross said it is the bond of the internal with the external. In one direction or another, for me poetry always bridges that inside with that of the outside, is the way of passing from one to the other of these spaces, but which unites them. The internal only can expressed when reflected in that outside -that necessary knot-, the outside can be a mirror or vice versa.

Published works
Naxos, Ollín, México, UFSIA: MAG-MEX-B 7813, (1966)
Amor el más oscuro (1969) 
Peach Melba, Sierra Madre, Series: Poesía en el mundo, (1970)
La dama de la torre, entitled La canción de Arnaut, Joaquín Mortiz, México, (poetry prize in the  concurso nacional de la juventud 1971, 1972), (1972)
Tres poemas (Colección Cuadernos de poesía), UNAM, (1981) 
Bacantes/Bacchae, Artífice Ediciones, México, (1982) 
Canto malabar, Fondo de Cultura Económica, (1987)
Pasaje de fuego, D.F., Boldó i Climent, México, 2 ed., (1987)
Espejo al sol (poemas 1964-1981), Secretaría de Educación Pública, (1989)
El diván de Antar, JM, (1990)
Jaguar, Ediciones Toledo, México, (1991)
Casuarinas (El ala del tigre), UNAM, Coordinación de Humanidades, Dirección General de Publicaciones, (1992)
Moira, Gobierno del Estado, Instituto Chiapaneco de Cultura, (1993)
Poemas de la India, UNAM, (1993)
Urracas, Editorial Aldus, (1995) 
De lejos viene, de lejos va llegando, Biblioteca del ISSSTE, (1999)
Los sueños. Elegías, Conaculta, México, Práctica Mortal, (2000)
Poemas escogidos 1965-1999, UNAM, (2000)
Ultramar (Letras Mexicanas), Fondo De Cultura Economica USA, (2002)
El vino de las cosas: ditirambos, Conaculta, México, (2004)
La realidad transfigurada en torno a las ideas del joven Nietzche, UNAM, (1985) 
Canto por un equinoccio de Saint John Perse, Cuadernos de Humanidades, UNAM-INBA, (1980) 
El himno de las ranas, Lectorum Pubns (Juv), (1992)
Los DOS Jardines: Mistica y Erotismo En Algunos Poetas Mexicanos (La Centena), Ediciones Sin Nombre, (2003)

External links
 Cross on Fondo Nacional para la Cultura y las Artes
Cross on Diccionario de Escritores en México
Atardecer En Cuicuilco
Los bebedores de pulque
Malinalco
Tenayuca
Uxmal
Nietzsche y la academia

1946 births
Living people
Mexican women poets
People from Mexico City
Mexican people of English descent
National Autonomous University of Mexico alumni
Mexican translators
Prix Roger Caillois recipients
International Writing Program alumni